Samuel Lister ( – 29 November 1913) was a New Zealand printer, newspaper proprietor and editor, radical. He was born in Edinburgh, Midlothian, Scotland, in about 1833.

References

1833 births
1913 deaths
New Zealand writers
New Zealand activists
Writers from Edinburgh
Scottish emigrants to New Zealand